Cikarang Dry Port (CDP) is a dry port located within Kota Jababeka at Cikarang, West Java, Indonesia.  CDP was established in 2010 with a total area of 200 hectares. It is operated by PT Cikarang Inland Port, a subsidiary of publicly listed PT Jababeka Tbk, and becomes the first and only Integrated Customs Services Zone in Indonesia. As an inland dry port model, CDP serves as a port extension providing solution to chronic congestion and delays at the major import export gateway of Tanjung Priok. The main objective is simply to cut the dwelling time from 3.2 days to the government target of 2.5 days.

To proceed 2.5 days dwelling time, CDP is involved by the government to maximize its function. It has been designed in such a way to integrate with Tanjung Priok. The concept is that when Tanjung Priok has completely accomplished the loading and unloading activities, then CDP runs the next stage i.e. port clearance. To accelerate its process, a freight train will carry containers from the seaport to CDP for inspection, administration, and quarantine purposes. For export, the similar process can also be done. The integration between Tanjung Priok and CDP is believed to be able to increase port capacity up to 8 million TEUs per year.  With CDP, the entire supply chain is coordinated and synchronized to facilitate productivity - a crucial matter for an industrial business development. CDP itself is able to accommodate 250 thousand TEUs.

Traffic solutions

The government is aware that CDP can bring other added value that is to reduce traffic between ports and industrial estates. Theoretically, CDP integration with Tanjung Priok can reduce road congestion by 30 percent. This contribution in turns generates fuel consumption efficiency estimated at 190 billion rupiahs per year.

Access

Under government's support, CDP is supported by the access of toll roads and railway system. In addition, new access to CDP is currently being developed. The National Development Planning Agency (Bappenas) and Indonesia Port Corporation region II (Pelindo II) plans to build an inland waterways. The project is to optimize an existing river namely Cikarang Bekasi Laut (CBL) by widening the river. The route expands from Tanjung Priok Port to CDP and will be utilized as a new transportation alternative. It will be more efficient in terms of time, energy and finance. No trucking activities are needed and the traffic hassle can be reduced especially at Inner Jakarta toll road and Jakarta - Cikampek toll road. Utilizing the river also means the government does not have to make a new toll road. In essence, the development of inland waterway or Cikarang Bekasi Laut (CBL) aims to optimize the potential of the river channel as an alternative transportation logistics that will connect off Tanjung Priok offshore with rural areas.

Product and services
 Container Yard (CY) – The container yard's capacity is 400,000 TEUs per annum expandable to 2.5 million TEUs per annum.
 Reefer Plugs – 128 reefer plugs are available with uninterruptible power supply and backup generator.
 Container Freight Station (CFS) for Import – 3,888 sqm of consolidation warehouse is available for Less than Container Load Cargo handling.
 Bonded Logistics Center – 11,960 sqm of cotton warehouse is available. Second warehouse is targeted to be 82,293 sqm large.
 Empty Container Depot – Empty container depot is available for picking up empty containers for export stuffing or storing empty containers after import.
 Integrated Customs – To support CDP as Integrated Customs Service Zone (KPPT – Kawasan Pelayanan Pabean Terpadu), Cikarang Customs Office is available in CDP area providing needed customs services and monitoring cargo movement at the gate 24/7 and 365 days.
 Integrated Quarantine – Animal, plant, and fish quarantine services are available and integrated within CDP's area.
 Physical Inspection – The facility is prepared for Red Line cargo inspection under customs supervision, and also quarantine inspection if required. Located inside the terminal brings cost and time efficiency. Joint inspection could be arranged for cargos those need both customs and quarantine inspections to save even more time and cost.
 Mobile X-Ray (Hi-Co Scan) – TMobile X-Ray for container scanning is available for physical inspection.
 Electronic Seal – Bonded transfer between sea port and dry port is equipped with Electronic Seal for security, monitoring and tracking.
 Railway Connection – Railway connection is available connecting CDP to the sea port up to Surabaya in East Java. Connection to other major cities of Java connection would be developed later.
 Trucks  – Trucks are available for bonded transfer and feeder services to factories and warehouses.
 Container Tracking – Online container tracking is available.
 Indonesia National Single Windows (INSW) – Cikarang Dry Port is one of several ports connected to INSW.

Stakeholders

As CDP offers services in cargo handling and logistics, it deals much with the customs. But not merely with the customs, the logistics service handled involves many stakeholders from both the government and the private sector. These stakeholders include exporters, importers, vessels providers, terminal operators, container freight stations, bonded warehouses, trucking and forwarding agents, third party logistics (3PL), empty container depots as well as banking and other supporting facilities.

International port code

CDP is legally permitted to deliver exported goods as well as receipt of imported goods to and from all over the world. This possibility is due to CDP having been registered in an international port network and already has a special and unique code which is IDJBK. This allows CDP to become an official Port of Origin and Port of Destination.

References

External links
 
 Jababeka
 Cikarang Dry Port

Ports and harbours of Indonesia
Dry ports